The Grammy Award for Best Regional Mexican Album was awarded from 2009 to 2011. Previous to this field, Regional Mexican albums were awarded within the Best Mexican/Mexican American Album field.

The award was discontinued in 2012 in a major overhaul of Grammy categories. In 2012, this category merged with the  Best Tejano Album category into the newly formed Best Regional Mexican or Tejano Album category. 

Years reflect the year in which the Grammy Awards were presented, for works released in the previous year.

Recipients 

 Album
.
Regional Mexican Album
Regional Mexican Album
Mexican regional
Awards established in 2009
Awards disestablished in 2011
Album awards